Yves Delage (13 May 1854 – 7 October 1920) was a French zoologist known for his work into invertebrate physiology and anatomy. He also discovered the function of the semicircular canals in the inner ear.  He is also famous for noting and preparing a speech on the Turin Shroud, arguing in favour of its authenticity. Delage estimated the probability that the image on the shroud was not caused by the body of Jesus Christ as 1 in 10 billion.

Life

He was born in Avignon on 13 May 1854. He became the director of the Station Biologique de Roscoff in 1901. From 1902 he was Professor of Zoology at the Sorbonne University in Paris. Delage performed influential experiments on the fertilization of sea urchin egg.

Delage was a critic of Darwinism. He argued for a version of neo-Lamarckism.

Publications 

 L’Appareil circulatoire des crustacés édriophalmes (1881)
 Contribution à l'étude de l'appareil circulatoire des crustacés édriophthalmes marins (1881)
 Évolution de la sacculine (1884)
 Sur le système nerveux et sur quelques autres points de l'organisation du Peltogaster (1886) 
 Embryogénie des éponges (1892)
 Faune de Cynthiadées de Roscoff et des côtes de Bretagne (1893)
 L’Hérédité et les grands problèmes de la biologie générale (1895)
 Traité de zoologie concrète (six volumes, 1896-1903) 
 La Nature des images hypnagogiques et le rôle des lueurs entoptiques dans le rêve (1903)
 Les Théories de l’évolution (1909)
 Comment pensent les bêtes (1911)
 La Parthénogénèse naturelle et expérimentale (1913), with Marie Goldsmith (secrétaire de L'Année biologique) ; chez Ernest Flammarion, 342 pages
 The Theories of Evolution (1913)
 Le Mendélisme et le mécanisme cytologique de l'hérédité (1919)
 Le Rêve (1920)

Notes

References
 
 

1854 births
1920 deaths
People from Avignon
French zoologists
Honorary Fellows of the Royal Society of Edinburgh
Lamarckism
Members of the French Academy of Sciences
Researchers of the Shroud of Turin